Atharid (flourished in 4th century AD) was a Gothic chieftain under the Thervingian leader Athanaric. He was the son of Athanaric's sub-king Rothesteus, and played a leading role in the killing of the Christian saint Sabbas the Goth.

See also
 Gothic persecution of Christians

References

 

4th-century Gothic people
Persecution of early Christians